Column of Julianus or the popularly known Belkıs Minaresi; It is an obelisk located in Ulus district of Ankara.

History 
Julianus, the last pagan Roman emperor, declared war on the Persians in 362 and created a route that would pass through Ankara. Upon the news that the emperor would take a break on the way to the expedition and stay in the city, preparations began in the whole city and the Julianus Column was erected to honor him. The Column of Julianus, which did not undergo any repairs or renovations for many years, was restored by the governorship in 2001.

Architectural features 

Gallery

References

External links 
Manar al-Athar digital archive page 

Monumental columns in Turkey
Ulus, Ankara
Obelisks in Turkey
Ancient Roman architects
Julian (emperor)